Yahyaabad (also Romanized as Yaḩyáābād, Yahyābād, and Yakhyyabad) is a village in Qaqazan-e Sharqi Rural District, in the Central District of Takestan County, Qazvin Province, Iran. At the 2006 census, its population was 2,857, in 565 families.

References 

Populated places in Takestan County